Citi Bike is a privately owned public bicycle sharing system serving the New York City boroughs of the Bronx, Brooklyn, Manhattan, and Queens, as well as Jersey City, New Jersey, and Hoboken, New Jersey. Named after lead sponsor Citigroup, it was operated by Motivate (formerly Alta Bicycle Share), with former Metropolitan Transportation Authority CEO Jay Walder as chief executive until September 30, 2018, when the company was acquired by Lyft. The system's bikes and stations use technology from Lyft.

First proposed in 2008 by the New York City Department of Transportation, Citi Bike's scheduled 2011 opening was delayed by Hurricane Sandy and technological problems. It officially opened in May 2013 with 332 stations and 6,000 bikes. By October 2017 annual expansions brought the totals to 706 stations and 12,000 bikes, making the service the largest bike sharing program in the United States. Further expansions for Citi Bike are planned to extend its service area across the Bronx, Brooklyn, Manhattan, and Queens, and increase the number of bikes to 40,000.

In October 2017 the system reached a total of 50 million rides and in July 2020 the system reached 100 million rides. , there are 169,000 annual subscribers. Monthly average ridership numbers increased above 100,000 for the first time in June 2021. The all-time record for single-day ridership occurred , when the system had 138,372 rides.

Development and delays 

In an effort to reduce emissions, road wear, collisions, and road and transit congestion and to improve public health, the New York City Department of Transportation (NYCDOT) researched alternative forms of transportation, publishing a strategic plan in 2008. According to NYCDOT statistics, 56% of all automobile trips within the city are under  (with 22% under  and 10% under ), well within distances readily served by bicycle. To encourage residents to use bicycles more, the city committed to expanding bike lane miles, bike racks, and bike-parking shelters. In the 2009 bicycle share feasibility report, the New York City Department of City Planning (DCP) recommended building out the system in three phases in the four most populous boroughs, but no timeline was made public. The city, which had already been encouraging cycling as transportation, decided to establish a bicycle share program of the kind that had seen success in other cities. In 2011, it selected Alta Bicycle Share to operate the bike share in New York City. Citi Bike was created as a public–private partnership operated by NYC Bike Share LLC, a wholly owned subsidiary of Alta.

The system, which was first supposed to start in fall 2011, got pushed back to summer 2012 due to uncertainties about where to place the rental stations. The city had originally intended to place Citi Bike stalls mostly on sidewalks and public plazas, but there were some locations where stalls would take up parking spaces. The 2012 implementation date was only for Phase 1 of Citi Bike, with more phases to come later. Software problems delayed the planned start until March 2013. These problems were also reported by Alta programs in Chicago and in Chattanooga, Tennessee. The problems reportedly occurred because the Public Bike System Company, a Canadian affiliate of Alta, was involved in a dispute with software supplier 8D Technologies. Then, Hurricane Sandy damaged 1,000 bicycles and 60 stations in storage at Brooklyn Navy Yard. As planning progressed, some residents expressed dismay at the lack of docking stations in their neighborhoods while others fought against stations on their blocks.

Deployment 
Citi Bike finally began operations on May 27, 2013, with 332 stations. The stations were located in Manhattan south of 59th Street and in Brooklyn north of Atlantic Avenue and west of Nostrand Avenue. Officials said the system opened with 6,000 bikes. At the time of implementation, it was the largest bikesharing program in the United States. When launched, the system was slated to expand to 10,000 bicycles and 600 stations in Manhattan south of 79th Street, plus stations in several Brooklyn neighborhoods, including Greenpoint, Crown Heights, Bedford-Stuyvesant, Park Slope and Carroll Gardens as well as parts of Queens. At first, the timeline for the expansion was not made publicly available, but it was later announced that the expansion would be complete by the end of 2016. There has been increasing interest in further expansion across New York City; for example, in June 2013 a Brooklyn politician opened a petition drive to accelerate deployment in Greenpoint. In contrast, the May 2013 installation deliberately bypassed South Williamsburg.

On August 6, 2013, riders took 42,010 trips, the largest single-day total for any North American bike-sharing system. In Citi Bike's first few months, some kiosks docked too many bikes while others did not have enough, so the company started using a fleet of box trucks to carry bikes between different kiosks every day. The kiosks also had some software problems in their early months. Problems included stations that did not accept payment information; kiosks where passersby could take bikes without paying because the bikes were not locked securely; and bike docks that did not work at all, forcing riders to travel to other stations.

The deployment of a clean energy public transit system such as Citi Bike coincides with the sixth IPCC report on mitigation's  call for an increase of modes of public transportation such as biking and walking. According to the report, "Case studies suggest that active mobility could reduce emissions from urban transport by 2%- 10% depending on the setting".

Popularity 

Citi Bike's massive, unexpected popularity caused problems within a year. In January 2014, the designer of Citi Bike's bicycles and docking stations filed for bankruptcy protection. Officials with Montreal, Quebec-based Public Bike System Company (also known as Bixi) said they were $46 million in debt, partly because the operators of Citi Bike and Chicago's Divvy bikeshare had withheld a combined $5 million in payments because of software glitches in the docking stations. Alta officials, who operate Citi Bike, Divvy, and Capital Bikeshare in Washington, D.C., said they anticipated no interruptions of service, though they did want $20 million to expand the system to 10,000 bikes and 600 stations. However, due to Citi Bike's various problems, expansions to the Upper East and Upper West Sides were delayed for at least a year. Its general manager resigned in March. The new mayor, Bill de Blasio, stated that he wanted to expand Citi Bike's reach, but that he could not make city funds available for such an expansion at that time.

Citi Bike workers joined Transport Workers Union of America Local 100 in July 2015. The company had about 200 employees joining the union at the time. On September 17, in the face of overwhelming support for unionization, Citi Bike agreed to recognize TWU Local 100's representation of Citi Bike's labor force.

Expansion

Reorganization 
On October 28, 2014, Alta Bicycle Share and NYCDOT announced a plan to improve and expand the Citi Bike program. Bikeshare Holdings LLC, a new entity formed by the partners at real estate developer Related Companies and gym chain Equinox Fitness, acquired Alta Bicycle Share—renamed Motivate—and named Jay Walder as the new chief executive. (Motivate, and by extension Citi Bike, was acquired by Lyft in 2018.) The increase of funding included $5 million from Bikeshare Holdings; $70.5 million from a 10-year extension of the Citigroup sponsorship; and $15 million from the Goldman Sachs Urban Investment Group. As part of the restructuring deal, Walder moved the company headquarters from Portland, Oregon, to New York City. The Citi Bike system would continue to be operated by NYC Bicycle Share, a subsidiary of Alta Bicycle Share. By 2017, Citi Bike would expand its operations by 6,000 bikes and add 375 new docking stations. This agreement also calls for improvements to the system's operations, including upgrades to its software and technology. The company was also appointing a vice president for technology.

Following two years of software errors in the bike share system, Motivate shut down the Citi Bike system over the last weekend of March 2015 to replace the existing system software with that of 8D Technologies. The new mobile platform was developed by the Polish software house Netguru. Since then, the Citi Bike system has continued to expand its installations using the 8D Technologies as its software and station equipment supplier. Through that summer, Motivate also refurbished all of the system's 6,000 bikes, as well as fixed the bicycle stations' kiosks and improved the bike docks at these stations.

Expansion to Jersey City and Queens 

In early 2015, as part of its expansion, NYCDOT and Motivate increased the price of annual memberships from $95 to $149 plus taxes, although annual rates for New York City Housing Authority residents and members of some Community Development Credit Unions will remain at $60 per year. That year, the company installed 91 new stations in Queens and Brooklyn, with 12 of these stations in Long Island City and the other 79 in Greenpoint, Williamsburg, and Bedford-Stuyvesant. Citi Bike also added 48 new stations on the Upper East and Upper West Sides, up to 86th Street. The system expanded across the Hudson River to Jersey City, New Jersey, on September 21, 2015, with 35 stations and 350 bikes. However, some Jersey City residents objected to the implementation of Citi Bike there, complaining of lost parking spots for cars. In July 2016, the Jersey City Citi Bike system was expanded for the first time, with another 15 stations and an additional 150 bikes.

In August 2016, the company started installing 139 new stations in Manhattan up to 110th Street and in Brooklyn between Red Hook and Prospect Park. Some residents of Park Slope were outspoken in opposition to the loss of car parking. One month later, on September 13, 2016, the system saw 64,672 trips, the highest recorded in one day at the time.

After the December 2016 announcement of a further expansion to Harlem and Astoria, some city politicians proposed expanding the system further to the Bronx and Staten Island. By the end of 2017, Citi Bike planned to double its bike fleet to 12,000, with the possibility that some of the expansion could be publicly funded.  On May 18, 2017, Motivate presented a proposal to expand the system in all five boroughs, including adding new stations to the Bronx and Staten Island, without any public funding. To make up for the lost tax funding, Motivate asked the city to waive fees charged for placing stalls inside former parking spots, as well as redesigning the payment hierarchy and possibly adding more ad space on pay stations. The 140 new stalls and 2,000 new bikes in Harlem, Crown Heights, Prospect Heights, Long Island City, and Astoria were installed in September 2017. The system saw its 50 millionth rider in early October 2017, as the new stalls were being activated. The new docking stations in Brooklyn led to an imbalance in the number of bikes in certain neighborhoods, since there were more bikes being docked in lower-elevation areas such as Downtown Brooklyn, while fewer riders docked bikes in high-elevation neighborhoods such as Prospect Heights and Crown Heights.

Dockless and phase 3 expansion 
In 2018, officials proposed dockless bike sharing for the Citi Bike network, which would allow bikes to be rented without being tethered to docks. This was proposed after several bike sharing companies announced their intent to operate in New York City. In early August of that year, the dockless bike-sharing company Spin had started a dockless operation in the Rockaways, but had been told to cease and desist operations by the NYCDOT, which had licensed Citi Bike as the only official bike-share operator in New York City. Spin, intending to compete with Citi Bike with lower per-half-hour pricing—struggled the rest of the month to get a permit. By the end of August, Citi Bike started designing a dockless prototype that could lock its own wheels based on whether the customer had paid. As part of a pilot program, Citi Bike also started testing 200 pedal-assisted electric bicycles, which soon became popular among customers.

Lyft, which had acquired Motivate in July 2018, announced a further expansion of Citi Bike service in November 2018. In addition, the number of bicycles would more than triple, from 12,000 to 40,000. This would make Citi Bike among the largest bike-share systems in the world. The Gothamist website, citing a Lyft employee, stated that electric bikes would make up the "vast majority" of the new bikes. In February 2019, it was announced that the Citi Bike system would have 4,000 electric bikes by that June, up from 200. Because of the popularity of the electric bikes, a $2 fee would be added to each electric bike trip starting April 27. However, on April 14, the company announced that all their electric bikes would be removed from service due to accidents while braking.

In July 2019, Citi Bike announced a timeline for its phase 3 expansion, which would double its service area. By 2020, stalls would be installed in the remainder of Upper Manhattan (namely Hamilton Heights, Washington Heights, and Inwood) and in the South Bronx. Before 2023, new stalls would also be installed in southwest, southeast, and eastern Brooklyn, including Brownsville, East Flatbush, Kensington, Prospect Lefferts Gardens, Sunset Park, and the remaining portions of Bedford–Stuyvesant and Crown Heights. Stalls would also be installed in northwestern Queens, namely Sunnyside, Maspeth, Elmhurst, Jackson Heights, and Corona. That September 5, Citi Bike reached 91,529 trips, the highest-ever single-day ridership.

In May 2020, the system expanded into the Bronx and further north into Manhattan. Amid the COVID-19 pandemic in the United States, Citi Bike recorded its 100 millionth ride that year, as the pandemic resulted in an increase in bicycle usage. During August 2020, the governments of Jersey City and Hoboken, New Jersey, finalized an agreement with Lyft to operate Citi Bike stations in both cities for at least five years. The changes included upgrades to 51 existing Citi Bike stations in Jersey City and the addition of 46 additional stations in both cities during 2020 and 2021. In total, there would be nearly 1,000 Citi Bikes and 95 stations in New Jersey as part of the agreement. Hoboken had previously been served by a bike share system named JerseyBike, which was incompatible with Citi Bike, The Jersey City Municipal Council and the Hoboken City Council both approved their respective portions of the expansion in early 2021. Monthly average ridership numbers were above 100,000 for the first time in June 2021. On September 11, 2021, Citi Bike set a single day ridership record of 135,005 rides.

Company 

Citi Bike is not funded by any subsidies from the city. Citigroup spent  million to be its lead sponsor for six years, and in return was allowed to put its name on the bikes; in 2014, Citigroup injected an additional  and extended its sponsorship through 2024. However, the bikeshare is owned by NYC Bike Share LLC, a subsidiary of Alta Bicycle Share, Inc. Jay Walder was the CEO of Bikeshare Holdings, which includes Alta Bicycle Share, and in turn, NYC Bike Share LLC and Citi Bike, until 2018 when the company was acquired by Lyft. In February 2017, Motivate and 8D Technologies merged, with Citi Bike ultimately being operated under the purview of the combined companies. , Citi Bike is the largest bike-sharing system in the United States, a distinction it first held when it opened in 2013. Citi Bike also had 130,000 members , up from 100,000 members in 2016.

Citi Bike had 5.8 million annual trips in 2013, increasing to 8 million trips in 2014; 10 million in 2015; 14.1 million in 2016; 16.4 million in 2017; and 17.6 million in 2018.  the bike share averaged 48,315 daily trips, up 8% from 2017. When Citi Bike recorded 70,286 trips on July 26, 2017, it was called "the highest single-day ridership of any [bike share] system in the Western world outside of Paris." The majority of Citi Bike riders were male , with women making a quarter of the trips and a third of membership.

A software developer at Genius extrapolated that from July 2016 to June 2017, forty percent of all taxi trips taken within neighborhoods served by Citi Bike were slower than the same trip via bike. Over half of all Citi Bike trips occur during rush hours . However, in 2015, there were at least 10 times as many taxi trips as Citi Bike trips in Midtown during rush hour. The NYCDOT publishes a list of Citi Bike usage statistics on its website.

In Citi Bike's first three years of operations, no one died while riding a Citi Bike. This was partly attributed to the bikes' design, as well as the higher concentration of cyclists on New York City roads before and since Citi Bike's launch. The first death involving a Citi Bike occurred four years after the service's launch, in June 2017, when a cyclist in Chelsea was struck by a bus.

Bikes 
The bicycles are utility bicycles; they have a unisex step-through frame with an upright seating position. They weigh about  each. Their one-piece aluminum frame and handlebars conceal cables and fasteners in an effort to protect them from vandalism and bad weather; the handlebars are located above the seat, allowing riders to sit upright and thereby maintain balance. They are equipped with Shimano Nexus three-speed, grip-shifter-operated internally-geared hubs, full mudguards/fenders and chain guard. The heavy-duty tires are puncture-resistant and filled with nitrogen to maintain proper inflation pressure longer. The tires are also wider, leading to increased stability. Twin LED rear lights of a pre-2015 design are integrated into the frame; the frame's bright-blue color increases the bikes' visibility. The bikes are built in Saguenay, Quebec, by Cycles Devinci. The bikes are assembled in Detroit.

In 2015, Ben Serotta helped redesign the bicycle to include a new seat, a simpler gear shifting mechanism, fewer and brighter lights, and a European-style center kickstand. All of Citi Bike's bicycles were to be renovated to include this new design. In 2016, a thousand of the newly redesigned Citi Bikes were taken out of service due to a part in the front wheel degrading faster than expected. In 2017, CitiBike began adding NuVinci gear hubs that offer continuous-gear shifting. In early 2017, as part of a pilot program with a firm named Blaze, 250 bikes received anterior laser lights that project a teal silhouette on the ground to warn drivers and pedestrians in their path.

Citi Bike moves thousands of bikes each day from places where they accumulate to places where they are scarce. It sometimes uses box trucks to accomplish this task. Citi Bike members can also volunteer to move bikes from full to empty stations. These members, called "Bike Angels," can earn rewards such as gift cards and renewed membership for moving these bikes. Since the "Bike Angels" program started in May 2016, almost 2,000 members have participated.

If a user does not re-dock their bike within a certain time limit—45 minutes for members or 30 minutes for non-members—they will be charged an extra fee. Annual members are charged $2.50 for every 15 minutes of further use, day pass users are charged $4 for every 15 minutes of further use, and single ride users are charged $3 for every 30 minutes of additional use. If a bike is not returned at all within 24 hours, a maximum "late fee" of $1,200 can be charged, though the fine may be reduced based on financial circumstances. In the event that a Citi Bike is lost or stolen, the member who last used it must file a theft report with the New York City Police Department within 24 hours, and they would be charged the maximum late fee. Late fees netted $5.2 million for Citi Bike from January to November 2015, comprising more than 15% of its revenue.  In 2014, there were 300 reports of stolen Citi Bikes, which jumped to 476 reports in the first half of 2015 alone. Stolen bikes have been found in the Brooklyn neighborhoods of East New York, Crown Heights, and Brownsville, as well as upper Manhattan. However, at least one man has ridden a Citi Bike as far as California.

Payment 

, yearly passes cost $205, or $17 per month with an annual commitment. A reduced-fare pass costs $60, or $5 per month with an annual commitment, and is available only to NYCHA residents who are 16 or older, members of selected credit unions, or recipients of SNAP benefits. The original price of a Citi Bike annual membership was $95 but jumped to $149 in 2014. Purchasers using a Citibank card receive a 10% discount when purchasing annual memberships through the Citi Bike website. Annual pass members receive a key and can make trips of up to 45 minutes without added charge, after which they pay $2.50 for each additional 15 minutes.

Initial prices for daily and weekday passes sold at Citi Bike docking stations were $9.95 for a daily pass and $25 for a weekly pass.  As of March 2023, Citi Bike only offers a single day pass, costing $19. Trips using these passes are limited to 30 minutes before the rider is charged an additional fee of $4 per 15 minutes. The 8.875% New York State sales tax is added to the cost of all passes. , day pass users pay an additional $0.26 per minute if they upgrade to an electric bike.

Riders may also access the Citi Bike system through the Lyft Pink All Access subscription, costing $199 per year. 

For riders who do not buy passes, a single ride costs $4.49 for 30 minutes, plus an additional charge if the bike is not docked within 30 minutes. Trips on electric bikes cost an additional $2, or 50 cents for reduced-fare members.

All payments are by credit card; Wageworks and Transitchek prepaid commuter cards are not accepted, as bike sharing programs do not qualify as eligible commuting expenses under US tax law.

Criticism 
When Citi Bike first launched, at least one bike shop owner said that he was forced to close down his business in 2014 due to the popularity of Citi Bike. Dorothy Rabinowitz of The Wall Street Journal said, a few days after the system opened, that under the "autocratic" mayoralty of Michael Bloomberg, "we now look at a city whose best neighborhoods are absolutely begrimed by these blazing blue Citibank bikes." Some people disliked the bright blue color and branding of the bicycles, while others pointed out that the stations blocked fire hydrants on the street.  The concrete wheel stops at the end of each kiosk also posed a hazard, acting as a sudden, sharp speed bump.  Another complaint was that bike stations take up car parking space for each eight bikes, a sentiment repeated in future dock installations.

Later expansions faced the opposite dilemma of having too few stations: one Streetsblog writer noted that the stations in the expansions were spaced farther apart than the stations in the original service area, which would make the Citi Bike stations in these areas harder to access. In September 2017, a reporter for Time Out magazine wrote that the system did not serve the outer boroughs adequately, with stations only located in wealthier areas of Manhattan, Brooklyn, and Queens that were closer to the Manhattan central business districts.

See also 

 Cycling in New York City
 Cycling in Jersey City
 List of bicycle sharing systems

References

External links 

 

Community bicycle programs
Cycling in New York City
Citigroup
2013 establishments in New York City
Bicycle sharing in the United States